Spiranthes incurva, the Sphinx ladies' tresses, is a species of flowering plant in the family Orchidaceae. This orchid is native to the upper Midwest and Great Lakes Basin of North America. The species was originally described as Ibidium incurvum  in 1906. Long treated as part of a sensu lato Spiranthes cernua, the species complex was reevaluated and Spiranthes incurva reestablished as a separate species in 2017. Spiranthes incurva is an ancient natural hybrid of S. cernua sensu stricto and S. magnicamporum.

References

incurva
Orchids of the United States
Plants described in 1906